Pahalage Rohitha Piyatissa Abeygunawardena (රෝහිත අබේගුණවර්ධන) (born 21 September 1966) is a Sri Lankan politician and businessman. He was the Minister of Nation Building. He is a representative of Kalutara District for the United People's Freedom Alliance in the Parliament of Sri Lanka. On 27 November 2019, he was appointed as Minister for Energy On 12 August 2020, he was appointed as the minister of ports and shipping.

Education 
Rohitha Abeygunawardena was educated at Gnanodaya Vidyalaya, Kalutara.

Early career 
He was the driver of minister Ediriweera Premarathna and taking his trust to built his political career. Daughter of Ediriweera even stated to an article the first time to get the driving job, he came in a bycycle.

Investigations 
Abeygunawardena was questioned in September 2008 on allegations of undeclared assets estimated at more than Rs. 450 million. The two officers who were conducting the investigation were later transferred out of the Bribery commission.

The Commission of Bribery and Corruption filed a case against Abeygunawardena on 8 January 2016 over undeclared and illegally earned assets worth over Rs 41.1 million. The Director General of the Bribery Commission alleged that the minister made 66 unlawful monetary transactions, constructed a house and purchased a jeep.

References

Sinhalese businesspeople
1966 births
Living people
Members of the 12th Parliament of Sri Lanka
Members of the 13th Parliament of Sri Lanka
Members of the 14th Parliament of Sri Lanka
Members of the 15th Parliament of Sri Lanka
Members of the 16th Parliament of Sri Lanka
Sri Lanka Podujana Peramuna politicians
Government ministers of Sri Lanka
Sri Lanka Freedom Party politicians
United People's Freedom Alliance politicians